Odnoin Bakhyt (born 24 February 1954) is a Mongolian wrestler. He competed in the men's freestyle +100 kg at the 1980 Summer Olympics.

References

External links
 

1954 births
Living people
Mongolian male sport wrestlers
Olympic wrestlers of Mongolia
Wrestlers at the 1980 Summer Olympics
Place of birth missing (living people)